Marvel Super Hero Adventures is an animated series based on characters created by Marvel Comics. Aimed at a preschool audience, the shorts first air on Disney Channel's Disney Junior block, followed by the Disney Junior channel and later the Marvel HQ YouTube channel and DisneyNOW app. The series uses the style of the 2017 animated series, but with Flash animation and Canadian voice actors.

Plot
The series depicts Spider-Man telling the viewers how he helped another superhero stop a villain.

Production
Marvel Super Hero Adventures was announced via The Hollywood Reporter on September 7, 2017 as part of a multi-media push across publishing and merchandise aimed at introducing the Marvel Universe to a younger audience. The first season, which consists of ten 3.5 minute episodes, debuted on October 13, 2017. The second season followed on October 22, 2018. The third season began on Disney Junior and DisneyNOW on April 1, 2019, with the fourth on April 6, 2020. No more new shorts were produced as of September 2020.

The series was directed by Svend Gregori and produced at Atomic Cartoons.

Voice cast
 Cole Howard as Spider-Man
 Noel Johansen as Iron Man
 Brian Drummond as Groot
 David Atar as Thor
 James Blight as Hulk
 Adrian Petriw as Ant-Man
 Zac Siewert as Miles Morales
 Aliza Vellani as Ms. Marvel
 Michael Daingerfield as Captain America, Tinkerer
 Jacqueline Samuda as Captain Marvel
 Omari Newton as Black Panther
 Jesse Inocalla as Reptil
 Emily Tennant as Ghost-Spider
 Gigi Saul Guerrero as Spider-Girl
 Deven Mack as Falcon
 Michael Dobson as Ultron, Absorbing Man
 Marlie Collins as Wasp
 Diana Kaarina as Nebula
 Trevor Devall as Rocket Raccoon
 Toren Atkinson as Doctor Strange
 Elysia Rotaru as She-Hulk
 Matt Cowlrick as Loki, Hot Dog Vendor
 Luc Roderique as Doctor Octopus
 Ian James Corlett as Electro, Swarm
 Mark Oliver as Stegron
 Sam Vincent as Green Goblin, Miek, Blackjack O'Hare
 Andrew Francis as Hobgoblin
 Odessa Rojen as Ironheart
 Nicole Oliver as Morgan le Fay
 Tabitha St. Germain as Boy, Girl 
 Bill Newton as Mister Fantastic
 Lauren Jackson as Invisible Woman

Episodes

Season 1

Season 2

Season 3

Season 4

Specials

Franchise
Marvel Super Hero Adventures pre-school franchise was announced by Marvel Entertainment in September 2017 consisting of a short-form animated series along with publishing and merchandise during "Marvel Mania" October. The toy line was manufactured by Hasbro with additional merchandise from Mad Engine, Jay Franco, GBG, Jakks Pacific and others.

In the publishing field, Marvel Press issued chapter books beginning in September and of course from Marvel Comics a five-issue miniseries starting in April 2018. Super Hero Adventures has Spider-Man teaming with another Marvel hero. The first early reader chapter books was Deck the Malls! teamed Spider-Man with Spider-Gwen written by MacKenzie Cadenhead and Sean Ryan and art by Derek Laufman. Three additional chapter books were planned continuing into 2018. With low orders, the limited series was re-solicited as a series of issue 1.

Comic books - five #1 issues written by Jim McCann with art by Dario Brizuela:
 Marvel Super-Hero Adventures: Spider-Man and the Stolen Vibranium #1
 Marvel Super-Hero Adventures: The Spider-Doctor #1 (Marvel Super-Hero Adventures #2)

early reader chapter books:
Deck the Malls! teamed Spider-Man with Spider-Gwen written by MacKenzie Cadenhead and Sean Ryan and art by Derek Laufman

Notes

References

External links
 

2017 American television series debuts
2020 American television series endings
2010s American animated television series
2020s American animated television series
2010s American comic science fiction television series
2020s American comic science fiction television series
2017 Canadian television series debuts
2010s Canadian animated television series
2020s Canadian animated television series
2010s Canadian comic science fiction television series
2020s Canadian comic science fiction television series
2010s preschool education television series
2020s preschool education television series
Animated television shows based on Marvel Comics
American children's animated action television series
American children's animated adventure television series
American children's animated comic science fiction television series
American children's animated superhero television series
American flash animated television series
American preschool education television series
Animated preschool education television series
Animated television series about children
Canadian children's animated action television series
Canadian children's animated adventure television series
Canadian children's animated comic science fiction television series
Canadian children's animated superhero television series
Canadian flash animated television series
Canadian preschool education television series
Child superheroes
Disney Junior original programming
English-language television shows